The 2017 Nordic Golf League was the 19th season of the Nordic Golf League, one of four third-tier tours recognised by the European Tour.

With the exception of a four-event Winter Series held in Spain, all official tournaments were held in Norway, Sweden, Finland, or Denmark. Although the ranking is calculated in euros, many prize funds are set in Danish krone or Swedish krona.

Schedule
The following table lists official events during the 2017 season.

Order of Merit
The Order of Merit was titled as the Road to Europe and was based on prize money won during the season, calculated using a points-based system. The top five players on the tour (not otherwise exempt) earned status to play on the 2018 Challenge Tour.

See also
2017 Danish Golf Tour
2017 Swedish Golf Tour

Notes

References

Nordic Golf League